1877 was the 91st season of cricket in England since the foundation of Marylebone Cricket Club (MCC).

Champion County

 Gloucestershire

Playing record (by county)

Leading batsmen (qualification 20 innings)

Leading bowlers (qualification 1,000 balls)

Events
15 - 19 March.  Australia v. England at Melbourne Cricket Ground.  Afterwards recognised as the first-ever Test Match.  Australia won by 45 runs with Charles Bannerman scoring 165*: the first Test century.  William Midwinter, with 5–78 in England's first innings, was the first bowler to take five wickets in a Test innings.

31 March - 4 April.  Australia v. England: Second Test, also at MCG.  England won by 4 wickets.

27 July - 28 July. Gloucestershire beats an "unrepresentative" (Wisden) England team by five wickets. Since 1877 only Yorkshire in 1905 and 1935 has equalled this feat.

10 & 12 November.  South Australia v. Tasmania at Adelaide was the earliest first class match played by South Australia.  They won by an innings and 13 runs, their team including George Giffen.

Notes
An unofficial seasonal title sometimes proclaimed by consensus of media and historians prior to December 1889 when the official County Championship was constituted.  Although there are ante-dated claims prior to 1873, when residence qualifications were introduced, it is only since that ruling that any quasi-official status can be ascribed.

References

Annual reviews
 John Lillywhite’s Cricketer’s Companion (Green Lilly), Lillywhite, 1878
 James Lillywhite’s Cricketers’ Annual (Red Lilly), Lillywhite, 1878
 John Wisden's Cricketers' Almanack 1878

External links
 CricketArchive – season summaries

1877 in English cricket
English cricket seasons in the 19th century